Neil Foley is an American historian.

Life
Dr. Neil Foley graduated from the University of Virginia and earned a M.A. from Georgetown University. He also holds a Master of Arts degree from the University of Michigan, where he attained the Ph.D. in American Culture in 1990.

Foley has taught at Humboldt University of Berlin.

He previously taught at the University of Texas at Austin.

Dr. Foley began teaching at Southern Methodist University in August 2012.

Awards
 Frederick Jackson Turner Award of the Organization of American Historians, for The White Scourge: Mexicans, Blacks, and Poor Whites in Texas Cotton Culture
 Pacific Coast Branch Award of the American Historical Association
 Woodrow Wilson Center Fellow  
 Guggenheim Fellowship
 National Endowment for the Humanities Fellowship
 American Council of Learned Societies Fellowship
 Fulbright Fellowship

Works

References

External links
"The White Scourge", University of California Press
"Quest for Equality: The Failed Promise of Black-Brown Solidarity", Harvard University Press
"Mexicans in the Making of America", Harvard University Press

21st-century American historians
American male non-fiction writers
University of Virginia alumni
Georgetown University alumni
University of Michigan College of Literature, Science, and the Arts alumni
Academic staff of the Humboldt University of Berlin
University of Texas faculty
Living people
Year of birth missing (living people)
21st-century American male writers
Fulbright alumni